Fotaq "Foto" Strakosha (born 29 March 1965) is an Albanian retired goalkeeper and current goalkeeping coach of Lazio Youth. A member of the Greek minority in Albania, he is of ethnic Greek descent.

Strakosha is regarded as one of Albania's most popular and greatest goalkeepers. In his 20-years playing career he played with 11 different clubs, initially in Albania before moving in Greece in 1991 to spend the majority of his career there until his retirement in 2005. He captained the Albania national team for a number of years before his retirement in 2005. He became Albanian's most ever capped player having 73 caps to his name for the Albania national team from 1990 to 2005.

Club career
Strakosha started his senior career for Minatori (now KF Memaliaj) in 1985 beforing moving to Albanian giants Dinamo Tirana. In his first season at Dinamo he won Albanian Cup and Albanian Supercup eventually. The next season was even more successful as he won all three competitions Albanian Superliga, Albanian Cup and Albanian Supercup. After another half-season with Dinamo, he moved to Greece playing initially for PAS Giannina for the remainder of the 1990–91 season. Then he moved immediately in Piraeus, playing for both teams Ethnikos Piraeus for 2 years and Olympiacos for other 4 years. During his time at Olympiacos he was always at top 3 best teams in Greece top-flight winning the title in his last season 1996–97. Then he signed for fellow top-flight side Panionios where he would play for 2 seasons, becoming a starter and winning the Greek Cup in his first season. He left Panionios to spend another 3 years and a half at top-flight joining Ionikos to play for 3 years before moving to Kallithea to spend the first half of the 2002–03 season. Then he moved for a year at Greece second top-flight playing for Kalamata for the remainder of the 2002–03 season and first half of the 2003–04 season for Ethnikos Asteras. He was returned in top-flight joining Proodeftiki for the remainder of the 2003–04 season prior moving once more at Panionios in the next season to end his playing career.

International career
Strakosha was Albania's national team goalkeeper from 1990 to 2005. He made his debut on 30 May 1990 and retired on 13 October 2005.

Strakosha was first called up in the Albania national team by coach Agron Sulaj for a Euro 1992 qualifier against Iceland in May 1990.

On the day of his first international game, he was already 25 years and 62 days old. The reason for such a late debut on the international stage was a surplus of qualified keepers in the Albanian international squads like the veteran Perlat Musta and the very promising youngster Blendi Nallbani

Due to Albania's staunch communist rule, despite his talent, Strakosha was playing in his country's domestic league as every single player in the international squad .

In his debut, Albania lost the game in Reykjavík 2–0 which added to their miserable run of 19 games without a single win. The game itself was not to be a special one for the rookie goalkeeper as he conceded 2 goals, which kept him aside for the following games.

Strakosha had to wait more than a year for his next shot at international football, with the departure of Agron Sulaj as the national manager and the introduction of Bejkush Birce.

This game was played after the fall of Communism in Albania which meant that from there on, players would be allowed to play abroad for the first time in 45 years. A notable impact like this, struck directly to the national team since nine players – notably Sulejman Demollari and Edmond Abazi – would be playing in foreign leagues, the majority choosing neighbour Greece, the same way Strakosha did.

His second international cap would be coincidentally in a friendly against these cross-border rivals which ended in a 2–0 win after striker Sokol Kushta scored twice.

Strakosha's career would follow up to the point to become Albania's most capped player, and achieving an extense career under the Eagle's goalposts.

Personal life 
Strakosha was born in Memaliaj, southern Albania and he is of Greek origin. His son Thomas plays as a goalkeeper for English club Brentford in Premier League and the Albania national football team. His son Dhimitri played as a striker in the lower leagues of Albania and Greece.

Managerial career
After his retirement, he became a goalkeeping coach. Until 2007 he was the Olympiakos goalkeeping coach, when he signed for the Cypriot champions APOEL FC. In 2011, he became the coach of Albania national under-19 football team. He left Albania U19 on 12 August 2014 to work for Olympiacos as goalkeeping coach. He left Olympiacos and moved at Lazio Youth to work again as goalkeeping coach; he rejoined his son Thomas which was part of Lazio's senior team.

Career statistics

Club

International

Honours 

Dinamo Tirana
 Albanian Superliga: 1989–90
 Albanian Cup: 1988–89, 1989–90
 Albanian Supercup: 1989, 1990

Olympiacos
 Super League Greece: 1996–97

Panionios
 Greek Cup: 1997–98

References

External links 
 

1965 births
Living people
People from Memaliaj
People from Tepelenë
Albanian emigrants to Greece
Association football goalkeepers
Albanian footballers
Albania international footballers
SK Tepelena players
FK Dinamo Tirana players
PAS Giannina F.C. players
Ethnikos Piraeus F.C. players
Olympiacos F.C. players
Panionios F.C. players
Ionikos F.C. players
Kallithea F.C. players
Kalamata F.C. players
Ethnikos Asteras F.C. players
Proodeftiki F.C. players
Albanian expatriate footballers
Expatriate footballers in Greece
Albanian expatriate sportspeople in Greece
Albanian football managers
Association football goalkeeping coaches